The History of Trade Unionism (1894, new edition 1920) is a book by Sidney and Beatrice Webb on the British trade union movement's development before 1920.

Outline
First published in 1894, it is a detailed and influential accounting of the roots and development of the British trade union movement. The research materials collected by the Webbs form the Webb Collection at the London School of Economics.

Contents
I The origins of trade unionism, 1
II The Struggle for existence 1799–1825, 64
III The Revolutionary period 1829–1842, 113
IV The new spirit and the new model, 1843–1860, 180
V The junta and their allies, 233
VI Sectional developments 1863–1885, 299
VII The old unionism and the new 1875–1890, 358
VIII The trade union world 1890–1894, 422
IX Thirty years’ growth 1890–1920, 472
X The place of trade unionism in the state 1890–1920, 594
XI Political organisation 1900–1920, 677

Editions

See also
United Kingdom labour law

External links
 
Full text of 1920 edition on archive.org
Raw text version on archive.org

1894 non-fiction books
Books about labor history
British trade unions history
British books